François Duval may refer to:

François Duval (composer) (1672–1728)
François Duval (dancer) (born 1743), known as Malter, was a French dancer
François Duval (politician) (1903–1984), a politician from Martinique who served in the French Senate
François Duval (born 1980), a Belgian rally driver